Mudigere is a Town Panchayath and Taluk in Chikkamagaluru district in the Indian state of Karnataka. It is 30 km from the district headquarters.

Mudigere is known for coffee and black pepper production.

Geography and climate
Thus, it is the 4th highest Administrative Town in Karnataka, after Madikeri, Somwarpet and Chikkamagaluru.

Demographics
 India census, Mudigere had a population of 8,962. Males constituted 51% of the population and females 49%. Mudigere had an average literacy rate of 82%, higher than the national average of 59.5%: male literacy was 85%, and female literacy was 79%. In Mudigere in 2001, 10% of the population was under 6 years of age.

Villages
There are twenty-nine Panchayath villages in Mudigere Taluk:

Tourist attractions
The temples Bettada Byraweshwara near Mekanagadde and Nanyada Byraweshwara near Byrapura (Hosakere), which lies 25 km south of Mudigere, Devaramane near Gutthi are popular tourist destinations in Mudigere. Ballalarayana Durga or Durgada Betta near Sunkasale grama is another trekking and tourist attraction. 
Travelling from Kottigehara to Kalasa gives an enchanting experience of coffee plantations and green hills of Mudigere taluk. Shankara Falls is located near Mudigere.

Education
Mudigere has many private and Government schools and colleges including the College of Horticulture.

Notable people
 Poornachandra Tejaswi
 Motamma
V. G. Siddhartha

See also 

 Mangalore
 Nellyadi
 Charmadi
 Kudremukh
 Dharmasthala
 Ujire

References

External links 

Cities and towns in Chikkamagaluru district
Populated places in the Western Ghats
Tourist attractions in Karnataka
Hill stations in Karnataka